The 2012 WSA World Series Finals is the women's edition of the 2012 WSA World Series Finals (Prize money : $50 000). The event took place at the Queen's Club in London in England between 2–6 January 2013. Nicol David won her second WSA World Series Finlas trophy, beating Laura Massaro in the final.

Seeds

Group stage results

Pool A

Pool B

Draw and results

See also
2012 PSA World Series Finals
WSA World Tour 2012
WSA World Series 2012
WSA World Series Finals

References

External links
WSA World Series website
World Series Final 2012 official website
World Series Final 2012 SquashInfo website

WSA World Tour
WSA World Series Finals
WSA World Series Finals
WSA World Series Finals
WSA World Series Finals
WSA World Series Finals
Squash competitions in London